The Cimitero Monumentale  ("Monumental Cemetery") is one of the two largest cemeteries in Milan, Italy, the other one being the Cimitero Maggiore. It is noted for the abundance of artistic tombs and monuments.

Designed by the architect Carlo Maciachini (1818–1899), it was planned to consolidate a number of small cemeteries that used to be scattered around the city into a single location.

Officially opened in 1866, it has since then been filled with a wide range of contemporary and classical Italian sculptures as well as Greek temples, elaborate obelisks, and other original works such as a scaled-down version of the Trajan's Column. Many of the tombs belong to noted industrialist dynasties, and were designed by artists such as Adolfo Wildt, Giò Ponti, Arturo Martini, Agenore Fabbri, Lucio Fontana, Medardo Rosso, Giacomo Manzù, Floriano Bodini, and Giò Pomodoro.

The main entrance is through the large Famedio, a massive Hall of Fame-like Neo-Medieval style building made of marble and stone that contains the tombs of some of the city's and the country's most honored citizens, including that of novelist Alessandro Manzoni.

The Civico Mausoleo Palanti designed by the architect Mario Palanti is a tomb built for meritorious "Milanesi", or citizens of Milan. The memorial of about 800 Milanese killed in Nazi concentration camps is located in the center and is the work of the group BBPR, formed by leading exponents of Italian rationalist architecture that included Gianluigi Banfi.

The cemetery has a special section for those who do not belong to the Catholic religion and a Jewish section.

Near the entrance there is a permanent exhibition of prints, photographs, and maps outlining the cemetery's historical development. It includes two battery-operated electric hearses built in the 1920s.

The Jewish Section 
The section, designned by Carlo Maciachini, opened in 1872 to replace the cemeteries of Porta Tenaglia, Porta Magenta, and Porta Vercellina. It lies east of the Catholic cemetery and has a separate entrance. The area is the result of a 1913 expansione to the southern and east. The central building was originally the entrance to the cemetery.

Tomb numbering is repeated because the cemetery is divided into six fields and an addition in the eastern side. There are also three common fields, including one for children, where burials date from 1873 to 1894, with small gravestones on the ground bearing the names and dates of death.

The monuments, built from 1866 onward, are located along the walkways. There are also family shrines, two of which were designed by Maciachini, columbaria, and ossuaries along the northern and western cemetery walls and burials in the central building.
There are 1778 burials, some in memory of people killed by in Nazi concentration camps or in the Lake Maggiore massacres, including at Meina.

There are many monuments of artistic value built by important architects and sculptors, described in the guide book by Giovanna Ginex and Ornella Selvafolta .<ref>Giovanna Ginex, Ornella Selvafolta, The monumental cemetery of Milan’’, Silvana Editore, 1999</ref>

The following architects have worked in the Jewish section:  Carlo Maciachini (Davide Leonino and Pisa shrines), Giovanni Battista Bossi (Anselmo de Benedetti tomb), Ercole Balossi Merlo (Leon David Levi shrine), Luigi Conconi (Segre shrine), Giovanni Ceruti (Vitali shrine), Carlo Meroni (Taranto tomb), Cesare Mazzocchi (Giulio Foligno shrine), Manfredo d'Urbino (Jarach shrine, Mayer tomb, Besso tomb, Monument to the Jewish Martyrs of Nazism), Gigiotti Zanini (Zanini tomb), Adolfo Valabrega (Moisé Foligno shrine), Luigi Perrone (Goldfinger shrine). Sculptors whose work is found here include: Mario Quadrelli (Pisa shrine), Giuseppe Daniele Benzoni (Ottolenghi Finzi tomb), Luigi Vimercati (Estella Jung tomb), Agostino Caravati (Alessandro Forti tomb), Rizzardo Galli (Vittorio Finzi tomb), Enrico Cassi (De Daninos tomb), Attilio Prendoni (Errera and Conforti tomb), Eduardo Ximenes (Treves shrine), Giulio Branca (Giovanni Norsa tomb), fratelli Bonfanti (Davide and Beniamino Foà tomb), Enrico Astorri (Carolina Padova and Fanny Levi Cammeo tomb), Egidio Boninsegna (Giuseppe Levi tomb), Dario Viterbo (Levi Minzi columbarium), Giannino Castiglioni (Ettore Levis and Goldfinger tombs), Adolfo Wildt (Cesare Sarfatti tomb), Eugenio Pellini (Bettino Levi tomb), Arrigo Minerbi (Renato del Mar tomb), Roberto Terracini (Nino Colombo tomb).

The central building was enhanced in May 2015 with artistic windows that represent the Twelve Tribes of Israel by the artist Diego Pennacchio Ardemagni.

Crematorium
The cemetery contains the Crematorium Temple, which was the first crematorium to open in the Western world. The crematorium opened in 1876 and was operational until 1992. The building is also a columbarium. As with other early crematoria in Italy, it was built in Greek Revival architecture.

Famous graves

Signals located throughout the cemetery point visitors to several of the most remarkable tombs and monuments. Some of the persons interred in the cemetery include:
 Alberto Ascari (1918–1955), Formula One champion driver
 Antonio Ascari (1888–1925), Grand Prix champion driver
 Gae Aulenti (1927–2012), architect
 Lelio Basso (1903–1978), politician
 Ernesto Bazzaro (1859–1937), sculptor
 Luca Beltrami (1854–1933), architect
 Antonio Bernocchi  (1859–1939), industrialist
 Agostino Bertani (1812–1886), revolutionary, physician
 Arrigo Boito (1842–1918), composer, librettist
 Camillo Boito (1836–1914), architect
 Gino Bramieri (1928–1996), comedian and actor
 Gaspare Campari (1828–1882), drink maker
 Candido Cannavò (1930–2009), journalist
 Gianroberto Casaleggio (1954–2016), entrepreneur, political activist
 Carlo Cattaneo (1801–1869), philosopher, patriot
 Alfredo Catalani (1854–1893), composer
 Camilla Cederna (1911–1997), editor, writer
 Walter Chiari (1924–1991), actor
 Franco Corelli (1921–2003), opera tenor
 Valentina Cortese (1923–2019), actress
 Philippe Daverio (1949–2020), art historian
 Giangiacomo Feltrinelli (1926–1972), publisher, businessman
 Filippo Filippi (1830–1887), journalist, music critic
 Dario Fo (1926–2016), 1997 Nobel prize in Literature
 Carla Fracci (1936–2021), ballet dancer
 Giorgio Gaber (1939–2003), singer-songwriter, comedian
 Giorgio Gaslini (1929–2014), jazz pianist, composer, conductor
 Luigi Giussani (1922–2005), priest, founder of "Communion and Liberation"
 Paolo Grassi (1919–1981), theatrical impresario
 Francesco Hayez (1791–1882), painter
 Vladimir Horowitz (1903–1989), pianist
 Herbert Kilpin (1870–1916), founder of A.C. Milan football club
 Anna Kuliscioff (1857–1925), political activist
 Domenico Induno (1815–1878), painter
 Enzo Jannacci (1935–2013), singer-songwriter
 Alberto Lattuada (1914–2005), director
 Emilio Longoni (1859–1932), painter
 Carlo Maciachini (1818–1899), architect
 Cesare Maldini (1932–2016), football player
 Alessandro Manzoni (1785–1873), poet, novelist, considered the founder of modern Italian language; tomb located at the very center of the Famedio''
 Filippo Tommaso Marinetti (1876–1944), poet and main founder of the futurist movement
 Giuseppe Meazza (1910–1979), football player and manager
 Alda Merini (1931–2009), poet
 Lina Merlin (1887–1979), politician
 Franco Moschino (1950–1994), fashion designer
 Bruno Munari (1907–1998), artist
 Bob Noorda (1927–2010), graphic designer
 Magda Olivero (1910–2014), opera soprano
 Wanda Osiris (1905–1994), soubrette, actress, singer
 Giuseppe Palanti (1881–1946), painter
 Mario Palanti (1885–1978), architect
 Giovanni Pesce (1918–2007), communist partisan
 Giulietta Pezzi (1810–1878), writer
 Francesco Maria Piave (1810–1876), librettist, poet 
 Giò Pomodoro (1930–2002), artist
 Amilcare Ponchielli (1834–1886), composer 
 Gio Ponti (1891–1979), architect, industrial designer, artist
 Salvatore Quasimodo (1901–1968), 1959 Nobel prize in Literature
 Franca Rame (1929–2013), political activist, actress
 Medardo Rosso (1858–1928), sculptor
 Piero Sacerdoti (1905–1966), insurer
 Rosa Chiarina Scolari (1882–1949) Mother Superior who helped the Italian resistance movement
 Temistocle Solera (1815–1878), poet, opera composer, librettist
 Mario Tiberini (1826–1880) and his wife Angiolina Ortolani-Tiberini (1834–1913), opera singers.
 Arturo Toscanini (1867–1957), conductor and cellist
 Giovanni Treccani (1877–1961), publisher
 Filippo Turati (1857–1932), politician
 Leo Valiani (1909–1999), writer, politician
 Adolfo Wildt (1868–1931), sculptor

Mayors of Milan
 Aldo Aniasi (1921–2005), Mayor (1967–76)
 Giulio Belinzaghi (1818–1892), Mayor (1867–84; 1889–92)
 Emilio Caldara (1868–1942), Mayor (1914–20)
 Gino Cassinis (1885–1964), Mayor (1961–64)
 Virgilio Ferrari (1888–1975), Mayor (1951–61)
 Angelo Filippetti (1866–1936), Mayor (1920–22)
 Marco Formentini (1930–2021), Mayor (1993–97)
 Emanuele Greppi (1853–1931), Mayor (1911–14)
 Carlo Tognoli (1938–2021), Mayor (1976–86)

Gallery

Other famous graves

See also

 Monumental Cemetery of Staglieno, in Genoa
 Certosa di Bologna, the site of the city's monumental cemetery
 Monumental Cemetery of Bonaria in Sardinia

References

External links
 Video with photos from cemetery

Cemeteries in Milan
Tourist attractions in Milan
1866 establishments in Italy